Ateli Assembly constituency is one of the 90 constituencies in the Haryana Legislative Assembly of Haryana a north state of India. Ateli is also part of Bhiwani-Mahendragarh Lok Sabha constituency.

Members of Legislative Assembly

See also

 Ateli
 Mahendragarh district
 List of constituencies of Haryana Legislative Assembly

References

Assembly constituencies of Haryana
Mahendragarh district